Kirk Haston (born March 10, 1979) is an American former professional basketball player and politician. He played for Indiana University under coach Bobby Knight between 1998–99 and 2000–01. He was subsequently drafted 16th overall in 2001 by the Charlotte Hornets, with whom he played a reserve role for two years during the team's transition to New Orleans.

Since 2019, Haston has been a member of the Tennessee House of Representatives, representing Tennessee's 72nd state congressional district as a Republican.

Early life
Born in Lobelville, Tennessee, he attended Perry County High School in Linden, Tennessee, where, as a senior, he was a part of the 37–0 Class A state championship team, being named Class A "Mr. Basketball". His college career took place under head coach Bob Knight and Mike Davis at Indiana University where, in the 2000–01 season he led the Big Ten Conference in scoring and was a third-team All-American selection. In the 2000–01 season, Haston's buzzer-beating three-pointer helped IU beat the defending champion and top-ranked Michigan State 59–58 at Assembly Hall. During his sophomore year, he lost his mother, Patti Kirk Haston, 48, in a tornado that hit the county seat, Linden, Tennessee on May 5, 1999.

Basketball career
Haston was selected 16th overall by the Charlotte Hornets in the 2001 NBA draft; many analysts, who had pegged Haston in the late first round-early second round area, thought that the Hornets took Haston to be a 'zone breaker', working against the change in rules that allowed some forms of the zone defense in games. Haston was known for his sky hook shot and shooting range for a forward/center.

Haston averaged 1.2 points and 1 rebound per game, playing in 27 games. Haston would only play in the NBA for 2 years as his final NBA game was played on March 7, 2003, in a 102–76 win over the Cleveland Cavaliers. In his final game, Haston recorded 2 points and 1 rebound in 8 minutes of play.

He played the 2004–05 season with the Florida Flame for head coach Dennis Johnson in the NBA D-League. There he averaged 16 points, 7.9 rebounds, 1.2 blocks per game and was selected to the All NBDL First-Team. His season came to an end when he suffered a right knee injury that required season-ending knee surgery with three games remaining.

In 2005, he signed with Upea Capo D'Orlando of the Serie A. He and his wife Kasey soon returned from Sicily to Middle Tennessee when he was waived due to a right knee injury prior to the start of the season.

In 2010, he came back to Perry County High School to coach the boys basketball team. He then led his alma mater to two state appearances in his first seasons. In 2012, the Perry County Vikings finished their season as state runner-up.

Political career
In 2016 he published Days of Knight: How the General Changed My Life in which he details his mostly positive experiences playing for then Indiana Coach Bob Knight. Knight provided assistance and an endorsement during Haston's 2018 campaign to the Tennessee House of Representatives.

In 2018, Haston was elected to the Tennessee House of Representatives, representing District 72. He won with 81% of the vote.

Haston was inaugurated on January 8, 2019. That same month, Haston was appointed as the Vice Chairman of Tennessee's House Education Committee.

Career statistics

College

Source

|-
| align="left" | 1998–99
| align="left" | Indiana
| 34 || 13 || 22.4 || .514 || – || .753 || 6.5 || .9 || .6 || .8 || 9.9
|-
| align="left" | 1999–2000
| align="left" | Indiana
| 29 || 27 || 27.4 || .496 || .000 || .730 || 8.3 || 1.4 || .8 || 1.2 || 15.3
|-
| align="left" | 2000–01
| align="left" | Indiana
| 33 || 28 || 30.8 || .440 || .377 || .687 || 8.7 || 1.2 || 1.1 || 1.2 || 19.0
|-
| style="text-align:left;"| Career
| style="text-align:left;"|
| 96 || 68 || 26.8 || .473 || .366 || .717 || 7.8 || 1.2 || .8 || 1.1 || 14.6

NBA
Source

Regular season

|-
| align="left" | 
| align="left" | Charlotte
| 15 || 0 || 5.1 || .282 || .000 || .500 || 1.3 || .3 || .0 || .1 || 1.7
|-
| align="left" | 
| align="left" | New Orleans
| 12  || 0 || 4.8 || .118 || .000 || .500 || .6 || .3 || .0 || .4 || .5
|-
| style="text-align:left;"| Career
| style="text-align:left;"|
| 27 || 0 || 5.0 || .232 || .000 || .500 || 1.0 || .3 || .0 || .2 || 1.2

Playoffs

|-
| align="left" | 2002
| align="left" | Charlotte
| 2 || 0 || 2.0 || 1.000 || – || – || .5 || .0 || .5 || .0 || 1.0

NBA D-League
Source

|-
| align="left" | 2004–05
| align="left" | Florida
| 46 || 46 || 36.4 || .456 || .444 || .705 || 7.9 || 1.6 || 1.1 || 1.6 || 16.4

Electoral history

2018

2020

2022

References

External links
NBA.com profile

1979 births
Living people
All-American college men's basketball players
American athlete-politicians
American expatriate basketball people in Italy
American men's basketball players
Basketball players from Tennessee
Charlotte Hornets draft picks
Charlotte Hornets players
Florida Flame players
High school basketball coaches in the United States
Indiana Hoosiers men's basketball players
Republican Party members of the Tennessee House of Representatives
New Orleans Hornets players
People from Perry County, Tennessee
Power forwards (basketball)
21st-century American politicians